Night Hawk is an album by saxophonists Coleman Hawkins with Eddie "Lockjaw" Davis recorded at the end of 1960 and released on the Swingville label.

Reception

The contemporaneous DownBeat reviewer picked Hawkins' performance on "There Is No Greater Love" as the highlight, stating: "his fine sense of form and rhythmic construction [...] are exceptional, even for him". The AllMusic site awarded the album 4 stars, stating: "Hawkins was one of the main inspirations of his fellow tenor Eddie "Lockjaw" Davis, so it was logical that they would one day meet up in the recording studio. This CD has many fine moments from these two highly competitive jazzmen".

Track listing
 "Night Hawk" (Coleman Hawkins) – 10:30
 "There Is No Greater Love" (Isham Jones, Marty Symes) – 8:15
 "In a Mellow Tone" (Duke Ellington, Milt Gabler) – 6:45
 "Don't Take Your Love from Me" (Henry Nemo) – 8:35
 "Pedalin'" (Ken McIntyre) – 6:35

Personnel
 Coleman Hawkins, Eddie "Lockjaw" Davis – tenor saxophone
 Tommy Flanagan – piano
 Ron Carter – bass
 Gus Johnson – drums

References

Coleman Hawkins albums
Eddie "Lockjaw" Davis albums
1961 albums
Albums recorded at Van Gelder Studio
Swingville Records albums
Albums produced by Esmond Edwards